Fenglin may refer to the following places:


China

Towns
 Fenglin, Liling, a town in Liling City, Hunan
  (丰林镇), a town in De'an County, Jiangxi

Subdistricts and townships
 Fenglin Subdistrict, a subdistrict of Xinhua County, Hunan
  (枫林街道), a subdistrict of Yushan County, Jiangxi
  (凤林街道), a subdistrict of Huancui District, Weihai, Shandong
  (凤林乡), a township in Xuanhan County, Sichuan

Taiwan
 Fenglin, Hualien, a township in central Hualien County

See also
Zhang Fenglin (born 10 March 1993), a Chinese swimmer
He Fenglin (1873–1935), a general of the Republic of China